Al-Thabitiyah is a village in the Homs Governorate in central Syria, just east of Homs. Nearby localities include Fairouzeh to the west, Sakrah to the north, al-Rayyan to the south and Tell Zubaydah to the southwest. According to the Central Bureau of Statistics (CBS), al-Thabitiyah had a population of 1,946 in 2004. Its inhabitants are predominantly Shia Muslims.

References

Populated places in Homs District
Shia Muslim communities in Syria